J Train is a name for two rapid transit lines:
J/Z (New York City Subway service)
J Church, San Francisco